Copello is a Spanish-language surname that may refer to:

Alexis Copello (born 1985), Cuban triple jumper
Alfredo Copello (1903–?), Argentine boxer
Anna Carina Copello (born 1981), Peruvian dancer and musician
Eduardo Copello (1926–2000), Argentine racing driver
Santiago Copello (1880–1967), Argentine Cardinal of the Roman Catholic Church
Yasmani Copello (born 1987), Cuban-Turkish hurdler
Maria Pia Copello, fictional character in Peruvian television series Maria Pia & Timoteo

See also
Capello, a similar Italian surname

Spanish-language surnames